Record Kicks is an Italian Milan-based independent record label set up in 2003 by Nicolò Pozzoli (aka Nick Recordkicks) and specialized in both new and vintage black sounds: deep funk, soul, northern soul, afrobeat, rocksteady, dancefloor jazz.

Record Kicks has released records by Hannah Williams & The Affirmations, Martha High, Tanika Charles, Hannah Williams & The Tastemakers, Third Coast Kings, Trio Valore, The Liberators, Nick Pride & The Pimptones, Baby Charles, Diplomats Of Solid Sound, Dojo Cuts, Kokolo Afrobeat Orchestra, Milano Jazz Dance Combo, Calibro 35 and The BlueBeaters among others. In addition to single artists' releases, the label has been releasing two series of compilations: Soulshaker (currently at Volume 7) and Let's Boogaloo (currently at Volume 6).

In 2008 Record Kicks released the soundtrack for Australian film parody of Italian b-movies of the 60's and 70's Italian Spiderman.

While pressing both LPs and CDs Record Kicks still produces singles on 45s (usually in a restricted limited edition) and 12" EPs.

Alongside the record label, Record Kicks has its own music publishing division: Edizioni Record Kicks enrolled at SIAE, Italian authors and composers collecting society.

On 9 November 2013 the label celebrated its first ten years anniversary with a special night at 100 Club in London and a celebrative compilation called Record Kicks 10th.

Discography

Artist albums

Compilations

45s singles

EPs

External links
 Official Website
 Official Facebook Page
 Official Bandcamp Page
 Official Twitter Page
 Official Soundcloud

Notes

Italian independent record labels
Soul music record labels